The 2019 Russian Super Cup was the 17th annual Russian Super Cup match which was contested between the 2018–19 Russian Premier League champion, Zenit Saint Petersburg, and the 2018–19 Russian Cup winner, Lokomotiv Moscow. The final was played at VTB Arena.

Match details

References

2019–20 in Russian football
Russian Super Cup
FC Zenit Saint Petersburg matches
FC Lokomotiv Moscow matches
July 2019 sports events in Russia
2019 in Moscow
Football in Moscow